Pokaran Assembly constituency is one of constituencies of Rajasthan Legislative Assembly in the Jodhpur (Lok Sabha constituency).

List of members

Election results

References

See also 
Member of the Legislative Assembly (India)

Jodhpur district
Assembly constituencies of Rajasthan